The 2014–15 SPHL season was the 11th season of the Southern Professional Hockey League (SPHL).  The Knoxville Ice Bears defeated the Mississippi RiverKings in the President's Cup final 2 games to none to win their 4th SPHL title.

Preseason
Following the 2013-14 season, the Bloomington Thunder announced that they would cease operations as a professional franchise to field a junior team in the United States Hockey League.

In May 2014, the Mississippi Surge announced that they would suspend operations for the 2014-15 season.

In June 2014, the league approved the move of the Augusta Riverhawks to Macon, Georgia, with the team being rebranded the Macon Mayhem. The Mayhem will sit out the 2014-15 season, and will begin league play in the 2015-16 season.

Regular season
The October 25, 2014 game between the Peoria Rivermen and the Huntsville Havoc was postponed after Huntsville player Justin Cseter fell onto Peoria's Dennis Sicard's skate, slashing his thigh early in the second period. The conclusion of the game was played on February 7, prior to a regularly scheduled game between the teams. Peoria won the completion of the October 25 game 3-1, but Huntsville won the regularly scheduled game also by the score of 3-1.

Standings

‡ William B. Coffey Trophy winners
 Advanced to playoffs

Attendance

President's Cup playoffs

Playoff bracket

Finals
All times are local (EDT)

Awards
The SPHL All-Rookie team was announced on April 1, 2015, the All-SPHL teams on April 2, the Defensemen of the Year on April 3, the Rookie of the Year on April 6, the Goaltender of the Year on April 7, the Coach of the Year on April 8, and the Most Valuable Player on April 9.

All-SPHL selections

References

Southern Professional Hockey League seasons
Sphl